Cordyline cannifolia, is one of several plants known as the Palm Lily. It is an evergreen Australian plant. This shrub can grow to 5 metres tall, although in other situations it may be fully grown at only 60 cm tall. Found only in Queensland and the Northern Territory in rainforests and wet eucalyptus forests, the natural range of distribution is from near Rockhampton to Cape York.

The leaves are variable in size, from 20 to 50 cm long, and 5 to 12 cm wide. The leaf stems also vary in size, from 5 to 20 cm long. A good feature for identification is the glaucous under-leaf colour.

Like many of the Australian Cordyline plants, the dark red berries are another appealing ornamental feature. They're about a centimetre in diameter. For the garden, it is best suited to a warm and moist situation. Being a tropical plant, it is not suited to frost and cold winds.

Related Pages

 Palm lily

References 

cannifolia
Asparagales of Australia
Flora of Queensland
Flora of the Northern Territory
Garden plants
Taxa named by Robert Brown (botanist, born 1773)
Endemic flora of Australia